Return of the Prodigal Sunn is the debut album from Sunz of Man and Wu-Tang Clan affiliate Prodigal Sunn.

Track listing
"In My Life" (featuring 12 O'Clock, Chi-King, and Madam D)
"Soul Survivor"
"Movin' On Up" (featuring Madam D)
"Brutality (The Grindz Remix)" (featuring C.C.F. Division)
"Procrastinators" (featuring Free Murda, Yung Masta, and Bonzi J. Wells)
"The Traitor (Betrayal Intro)"
"Betrayal"
"Campaignin'" (featuring Yung Masta)
"Manhunt" (featuring 12 O'Clock)
"Lovely Ladies" (featuring Scotty)
"Godz People" (featuring Armel, Sharecka, and 60 Second Assassin)
"Puzzled"
"Reach Out" (featuring Madam D)
"Love is Love" (featuring Aleksei)
"Sunshine" (featuring Madam D, and Scotty)

2005 albums